Tinea porphyropa is a cave-dwelling moth of the  family Tineidae. It is known from Sumatra, Indonesia and Malaysia.

The wingspan is about 9 mm. The forewings are rather dark purple-grey with a cloudy darker spot on the end of the cell. The hindwings are rather dark bronzy-fuscous.

Subspecies
Tinea porphyropa porphyropa
Tinea porphyropa batuensis Bradley, 1973 (West Malaysia)

References

Tineinae
Moths described in 1927